David Ramsay Lunn (17 July 1930 – 19 July 2021) was a British Anglican bishop. From 1980 to 1997, he was Bishop of Sheffield in the Church of England.

Lunn was born on Tyneside and educated at the Kings School, Tynemouth, where he was head boy in 1947.

An Anglo-Catholic, he was opposed to the ordination of women, seeing it as an issue that needed examination at an ecumenical level. During his episcopacy, he oversaw an increase in lay ministry within the diocese, but also increased the number of clergy and improved the diocese's financial position. The period also saw the creation of the Nine O'Clock Service within one of the diocese's churches. Initially this seemed to be a successful attempt to broaden the appeal of the church, but in the end the project collapsed and required strong leadership from Lunn to heal the resulting wounds. Following the Hillsborough Disaster, he implemented the clergy disaster plan to improve the church's response to such disasters in future.

In 1997 Lunn was awarded an honorary LL.D. degree by Sheffield University. After retirement, during which he settled at Wetwang, he became an assistant bishop in the Diocese of York in 1991.

Works
Lunn wrote a multi-volume history of the area covered by the diocese including Rivers, Rectors and Abbots and Kings, Canals and Coal.

A keen gardener, he also wrote the booklet Roses Wild: A little book by the Bishop of Sheffield concerning the roses in his garden at Bishopscroft.

References

1930 births
2021 deaths
20th-century English Anglican priests
Bishops of Sheffield
20th-century Church of England bishops
Anglo-Catholic bishops
English Anglo-Catholics
Staff of Lincoln Theological College